Bryan Township is one of fifteen townships in Surry County, North Carolina, United States. The township had a population of 2,747 according to the 2010 census.

Geographically, Bryan Township occupies  in western Surry County.  There are no incorporated municipalities within Bryan Township; however, there are several smaller, unincorporated communities located here, including Devotion, Mountain Park, State Road, Union Hill and Zephyr.

References

Townships in Surry County, North Carolina
Townships in North Carolina